Universidad Nacional de Ucayali is a Peruvian football club, playing in the city of Pucallpa, Ucayali, Peru.

History

Universidad Nacional de Ucayali was founded in 1979 as the Universidad Nacional of Pucallpa. On December 1983, the club changed his name to Universidad Nacional de Ucayali.

In the 2001 Copa Perú, the club classified to National Stage but was eliminated by Universidad César Vallejo of Trujillo.

In the 2007 Copa Perú, the club classified to National Stage but was eliminated by Deportivo Hospital of Pucallpa.

In the 2011 Copa Perú, the club classified to the National Stage, but was eliminated by Pacífico of Lima in the quarterfinals.

Honours

Regional
Región III:
Winners (3): 2001, 2007, 2011

Liga Departamental de Ucayali:
Winners (3): 2001, 2005, 2007
Runner-up (2): 2011, 2016

See also
List of football clubs in Peru
Peruvian football league system

References

External links
 Official Web

Football clubs in Peru
University and college association football clubs
Association football clubs established in 1979
1979 establishments in Peru